Microtodon is an extinct genus of rodent, from the Baranomyinae subfamily of Cricetidae family. It lived in Pliocene epoch. It was described by Gerrit Smith Miller Jr. in 1928.

Species 
 Microtodon atavus (Shotwell, 1924)
 Microtodon mimus (Shotwell, 1956)

References 

Cricetidae
Prehistoric rodents
Fossil taxa described in 1928